Blackwood is an area in Cumbernauld, a town in North Lanarkshire, Scotland. Construction began during the 1990s. It is located north of Westfield Road, Cumbernauld, towards Kirkintilloch.

In a survey in 2000, it was the largest new settlement in Scotland that had not been recognised as a locality in 1991. At the time of the survey, it had a population of 1,470. Since then new housing has been built.

Blackwood is near to Broadwood Stadium, which opened in 1994 and is the home of Clyde Football Club, and is north of Broadwood Loch.

References 

Areas of Cumbernauld